The Beijing Sitong Bridge protest was a protest in China during the prelude to the 20th National Congress of the Chinese Communist Party (CCP).

The protester's identity has not been confirmed, but he has been dubbed Bridge Man or Banner Man in reference to Tank Man.

Background

Protests took place frequently in China in the 2000s, with 180,000 protests taking place in 2010 according to Tsinghua University sociology professor Sun Liping.

This protest against Xi Jinping and his policies was rare, as it came just days before the start of the CCP National Congress, a period during which the authorities imposed extremely tight control over protests and dissent. It was widely expected that Xi's rule for an unprecedented third term would be cemented at the Congress.

Protest

The protest was held on October 13, on Sitong Bridge by a lone protester. The protester, having disguised himself as a construction worker by wearing an orange vest and a yellow helmet, placed two banners on the bridge and set fire to tires to produce attention-drawing smoke. He then repeatedly chanted through a loudspeaker, "Go on strike at school and work, remove dictator and national traitor Xi Jinping! We want to eat, we want freedom, we want to vote!" He was soon arrested by security forces.

Photos of the event spread rapidly on online social media.

Though the New York Times published an article on 2022/12/07 naming him "Peng Lifa," the protester's identity has not been confirmed. However, some believe him to be an academic physicist and have flooded a Twitter account assumed to be linked to the protester with messages of admiration. The Wall Street Journal and Radio Free Asia reported that some activists believed the protester to be Peng Lifa, also known as Peng Zaizhou, a 48-year-old physics enthusiast.

Protest banner themes included Xi Jinping's cult of personality, dictatorship and totalitarian rule, infringement of human rights, strengthening of censorship, Xi Jinping's reelection despite failure to observe term limits, the Cultural Revolution, the implementation of the "zero-COVID" policy, and overwork.

Reactions

His act was described by BBC News as "one of the most significant acts of Chinese protest seen under Mr Xi's rule".

In response to the protest, numerous photos circulated in Twitter of posters showing solidarity with the protester and slogans denouncing Xi Jinping from campuses of numerous universities in the United States, United Kingdom, Canada, Netherlands and South Korea. Similar protest slogans subsequently appeared as graffiti in other cities in China and via AirDrop. Art celebrating his actions has also been shared online.

Censorship 

Photographs and videos of the protest were censored by the Chinese internet censorship system. Some individuals who reposted video or images of the protest were also arrested. Chinese authorities censored terms which could lead people to the protest, including "Sitong Bridge" and "brave man", and Bloomberg News reported that words such as "courage", "bridge" and even "Beijing" were also censored.

The following month, Apple released an iOS update that prevents AirDrop from being enabled in "Everyone" mode for more than 10 minutes at a time for users in China (after which it reverts to a mode requiring the sender to be on the receiver's contacts list). Apple publicly stated that this was intended to help reduce unsolicited images, and that the feature would become available outside of China at a later date. It was suggested by Bloomberg News that the change was made at the request of the Chinese government.

References

2022 protests
21st century in Beijing
October 2022 events in China
Protests in China
Events in Beijing
Protests over responses to the COVID-19 pandemic
Xi Jinping
Internet censorship in China
Chinese democracy movements